Vincentian Academy was a Roman Catholic college preparatory school near Pittsburgh, Pennsylvania.  It is located in the Roman Catholic Diocese of Pittsburgh. In February 2020 the Sisters of Charity of Nazareth announced the school would cease operations after the 2019-2020 school year.

Campus

Vincentian Academy comprises three buildings housed on a  campus in McCandless Township, a north suburb of Pittsburgh. At the time of its closure it had an approximate 13:1 student-to-teacher ratio, and the enrollment as of the 2019-2020 school year consisted of a total of 163 students.

Academics

As of 2019, Vincentian Academy claimed to maintain 100 percent university placement for its students. Vincentian was one of twelve schools in Pennsylvania that offered the International Baccalaureate Diploma Program.

The IB Program

At Vincentian Academy, approximately 80 percent of all juniors and seniors took some IB courses. Overall, 84 percent of all those students taking IB exams pass.

History
The school was founded by the Vincentian Sisters of Charity in 1932 as Vincentian High School. (The Vincentian Sisters of Charity have since been incorporated into another congregation, the Sisters of Charity of Nazareth.) The high school began an affiliation with Duquesne University in 1995, whereupon it adopted the  International Baccalaureate curriculum; the affiliation, during which the school was known as Vincentian Academy–Duquesne University, ended in June 2010.

Affiliation with Duquesne University
Early in the 1990s, Duquesne University president Dr. John E. Murray was investigating the possibility of a high school for Duquesne, disturbed by contemporary reports that American high schools were inferior to schools in Europe, Asia, and even third-world countries. Reasoning that a university-affiliated school could be a model for the region and offer an advanced curriculum and integrate the resources of a major university into its operation, Murray explored the possibility as an extension of Duquesne's Spiritan tradition of often unconventional leadership.

Dialogue with the Vincentian Sisters began in 1993; an agreement was finalized 1994, and the inaugurating class was set to enroll in 1995, with Dean Derek Whordley of the Duquesne University School of Education to be president of the new school. In September 1995, Vincentian Academy–Duquesne University became officially operational, and 31 new Academy students were assimilated into the high school classes. A slow expansion was planned, with the new Academy gradually replacing the old Vincentian High School.

The International Baccalaureate program was selected as the new Academy's curriculum because of its international appeal and academic quality. Moreover, it would be an attractive venue for university researchers and a unique experience for teachers. In adopting the IB, Vincentian Academy-Duquesne University became the only Catholic IB school in the world that was part of a major university.

End of university affiliation

In late January 2010, Duquesne University announced that it would be ending its 15-year partnership with Vincentian Academy. As such, Duquesne no longer has a part in performing administrative duties, and it does not determine a president for the school as before. The split became effective on June 30, 2010.

Duquesne University had begun to provide administrative support services for Vincentian in 1995 for a five-year period, whereafter the partnership agreement was renewed in 2001 for a ten-year period. Academy principal Sister Camille Panich noted that the reasons for the partnership had been achieved: "Duquesne has helped strengthen the Academy and position it for long-term success". Duquesne University president Charles J. Dougherty likewise noted that "our partnership agreement for administrative services is concluding with a stronger Vincentian Academy".

When the formal partnership ended, it was stated that some of the benefits that Duquesne University afforded to students, including use of the university's library and science facilities, would continue.

Changes in administration model

On March 11, 2016, Vincentian Academy principal Edward Bernot resigned to become the principal of Saint John Paul II Academy in Boca Raton, Florida. His term ended on June 2, 2016. His successor as principal of Vincentian Academy was former elementary school principal Rita Canton.

On November 1, 2016 the Sisters of Charity of Nazareth announced that Vincentian Academy would not be running under the "president–principal model" as of that day. It was announced that John Fedko, who formerly served as president of the Academy, would continue to work as a chairman for special projects. Sister Adeline Fehribach, Chair of the Sisters of Charity of Nazareth, noted that "We are very grateful to Mr. [John] Fedko for his leadership skills over the past five years and the SCN and the family of Vincentian Academy thank him for his assistance in this part of Vincentian's time of change." John Fedko's term as President lasted from July 1, 2011 to November 1, 2016.

Alma Mater
The following was instated as the school's official Alma Mater in 2007:

Oh, Vincentian! We hail our alma mater
Blue and gold, the colors we hold dear
Mind, heart, spirit, guided by our Father
Friendships formed will last throughout the years
Honesty, respect, and human kindness
Tempered with a pride in quality
Integrity, and faith in God define us
Oh, Vincentian! We hail thee

References

External links

Roman Catholic Diocese of Pittsburgh Home Page

Educational institutions established in 1932
Catholic secondary schools in Pennsylvania
Schools in Allegheny County, Pennsylvania
Education in Pittsburgh area
1932 establishments in Pennsylvania